The  is a railway line in Japan linking Toyono Station in Nagano, Nagano Prefecture and Echigo-Kawaguchi Station in Nagaoka, Niigata Prefecture. It is operated by East Japan Railway Company (JR East).

Stations

Rolling stock

 KiHa 110 series DMUs

History
The Iiyama Railway Co. opened the first section from Toyono to its namesake town in 1921, and extended the line in sections to Tokamachi in 1929, where it connected to the Japanese Government Railways line from Echigo-Kawaguchi which had opened in 1927.

The Iiyama Railway Co. was nationalised in 1944, and freight services ceased in 1987.

The line sees much snow in the winter. The line uses avalanche fences along steep slopes, snow sheds and has a melting system at level crossings to deal with the snow. A record 7.85m of snow fell at Mori-Miyanohara Station in February 1945, an event that is remembered with a pole just outside the station marking the vast amount of snow.

References

External links
Iiyama Line Timetable (in Japanese)

 
Lines of East Japan Railway Company
Railway lines in Nagano Prefecture
Rail transport in Niigata Prefecture